was a Japanese professional sumo wrestler from Okayama. He was the sport's 31st yokozuna.

Career
He was born . He made his professional debut in January 1910 and reached the top makuuchi division in May 1917. He won his first top division championship in May 1921 from the rank of ōzeki, with a perfect record of ten wins and no losses. After his second championship in May 1923 and a runner-up spot in January 1924, he was promoted to yokozuna. He was to win eight more championships during his yokozuna career, including three in a row in 1927. He was much stronger than his competition and had no serious rivals. As a result, turnout at tournaments tended to be quite poor. His last title came in March 1930. He fought his last bouts in May of that year and officially retired in October. His retirement came very suddenly, as he was at the height of his powers, and it left Miyagiyama as the only yokozuna.

Retirement

After retiring from active competition in 1930 he became the head of the Dewanoumi stable, initially on an acting basis only, and was known as Fukushima Oyakata. In 1949 he became the official head coach and the seventh Dewanoumi Oyakata. From 1944 to 1957 was also the chairman of the Sumo Association. During his tenure as chairman, in 1956, he performed his kanreki dohyō-iri or '60th year ring entrance ceremony' to commemorate his years as yokozuna. Later on in his tenure, he began to be blamed for the Sumo Association's problems and attempted to commit suicide by a sword and gas in May 1957. He was rescued, but retired as chairman. He remained the head of Dewanoumi stable until his death in November 1960 at the age of 64.

Top Division Record
In 1927 Tokyo and Osaka sumo merged and four tournaments a year in Tokyo and other locations began to be held.

See also
Glossary of sumo terms
Kanreki dohyō-iri
List of past sumo wrestlers
List of sumo tournament top division champions
List of yokozuna

References

External links

 Japan Sumo Association profile

1896 births
1960 deaths
Japanese sumo wrestlers
Yokozuna
Sumo people from Okayama Prefecture